RAC-gamma serine/threonine-protein kinase is an enzyme that in humans is encoded by the AKT3 gene.

Function 

The protein encoded by this gene is a member of the AKT subfamily of serine/threonine protein kinases. AKT kinases are known to be regulators of cell signaling in response to insulin and growth factors. They are involved in a wide variety of biological processes including cell proliferation, differentiation, apoptosis, tumorigenesis, as well as glycogen synthesis and glucose uptake. This kinase has been shown to be stimulated by platelet-derived growth factor (PDGF), insulin, and insulin-like growth factor 1 (IGF1). Alternatively splice transcript variants encoding distinct isoforms have been described. Mice lacking Akt3 have a normal glucose metabolism (no diabetes), have approximately normal body weight, but have a 25% reduction in brain mass. Incidentally, Akt3 is highly expressed in the brain.

Interactions 

AKT3 has been shown to interact with Protein kinase Mζ.

References

Further reading

External links
 
 

EC 2.7.11
Protein kinases